Çamköy is a village in the Gölhisar District of Burdur Province in Turkey. Its population is 620 (2021).

References

Villages in Gölhisar District